Nimbus contaminatus is a species of dung beetle native to Europe.

This species was formerly a member of the genus Aphodius.

References

Scarabaeidae
Beetles described in 1783
Beetles of Europe